Nourhein Belhaj Salem (born 6 July 2003) is a Tunisian Paralympic athlete. She won the silver medal in the women's shot put F40 event at the 2020 Summer Paralympics held in Tokyo, Japan.

References

Living people
2003 births
Tunisian female shot putters
Athletes (track and field) at the 2020 Summer Paralympics
Medalists at the 2020 Summer Paralympics
Paralympic silver medalists for Tunisia
Paralympic medalists in athletics (track and field)
Place of birth missing (living people)
21st-century Tunisian women